Mediterranean Harbor is a themed area in Tokyo DisneySea, the second park in the Tokyo Disney Resort, located in Urayasu, Chiba, Japan, near Tokyo, which opened in 2001. Mediterranean Harbor is the entrance "port-of-call," or hub, themed as an Italian port city named Porto Paradiso, complete with Venetian gondolas that guests can ride. The majority of places of interest throughout the port are various shops and restaurants.

Theming and layout 

Mediterranean Harbor's layout differs from the entry "lands" of other Disney parks as it is a large "V" shape rather than the main street that leads to a hub (as found in Disneyland's Main Street, U.S.A. or Disney's Hollywood Studios' Hollywood Boulevard).  The right path leads to Mysterious Island, while the left leads to the American Waterfront. Built into the architecture of the port is the Tokyo DisneySea Hotel MiraCosta. The hotel itself serves as a full-scale reproduction of the various buildings of Portofino and Venice's ports. The design choice of combining a real hotel within the themed park areas helps to further the illusion that (as either a park or hotel guest) you are in an actual city; since the hotel is a functional building (rather than a 'set facade'—the general standard in theme park designs) the effect of onlooking hotel guests, that may observe the park from hotel's rooms, balconies, and terraces serve in adding a level of kinetic authenticity in passing for an authentic Italian villa for park visitors, while the hotel guest enjoys the harborside views and novelty of location.  

Additionally, the Hotel MiraCosta also serves as the southern berm (or border) of the park. Mediterranean Harbor also features attractions such as the Fortress Explorations which is a meticulously themed, large-scale interactive play area for guests that features exploration-themed activities and attractions.

Attractions
DisneySea Transit Steamer Line (2001–present)
Venetian Gondolas (2001–present)
Fortress Explorations (2001–present)
Soaring: Fantastic Flight (2019–present)

Entertainment
Current 

Tokyo DisneySea Maritime Band (2001–present)
Mickey and Friends Harbor Greetings Time To Shine! (2021–present; "Time to Shine!" 20th anniversary)
Believe! Sea of Dreams (November 11, 2022–present)

Past
Italian Flag Squad (2001–unknown)
Mayor of Porto Paradiso (2001–unknown)
Living Statues (2001–unknown)
Singing Gondoliers (2001–unknown)
The Alchemist (2001–unknown)
Buccaneer Brigands (2001–unknown)
DisneySea Symphony (2003–2004; first anniversary)
BraviSEAmo! (2004–2011)
preceded by Meet & Smile (2006–2007; "Sea of Dreams" fifth anniversary)
preceded by Lido Isle Meet & Smile (2005–2006)
Porto Paradiso Water Carnival (2001–2004; Spring 2005 & 2006)
Trio Melodia (2006–2010)
The Legend of Mythica (2006–2014; "Sea of Dreams" fifth anniversary)
Disney in the Stars (2010)
Be Magical! (2011–2012; "Be Magical!" 10th anniversary) 
Crystal Wishes Journey (2016–2017, "Year of Wishes" 15th anniversary) 
Fantasmic! (2011–2020)

Seasonal
Lide Isle Welcome to Spring (Spring 2012)
preceded by Spring Carnival Fairies Primavera (Spring 2009 & 2010)
preceded by Primavera: Spring Time Sun (Spring 2008)
preceded by Spring Carnival Primavera (Spring 2007)
Mousequerade Dance (Halloween Season 2008–2010)
Candlelight Reflections (Winter Season 2005–2009; Harborside Christmas Celebration 2005–2010)
Christmas Wrapped in Ribbons (Harborside Christmas Celebration 2011)
Aladdin's Whole New World (2005)
Minnie's Wishing Ring (2005; "Dramatic DisneySea 2005" fourth anniversary)

Restaurants & refreshments
Cafe Portofino
Zambini Brothers' Ristorante
Mamma Biscotti's Bakery
Risorante di Canaletto
Gondolier Snacks
Magellan's
Magellan's Lounge
Refrescos

Shopping
Valentina's Sweets
Emporio
Galleria Disney
Fotografica
Il Postino Stationery
Figaro's Clothiers
Merchant of Venice Confections
Venetian Carnival Market
Miramare
Piccolo Mercato
Splendido
Rimembranze
Bella Minni Collections

References

External links 
The Official Website of Tokyo DisneySea
Joe's Tokyo Disneyland Resort Photo Site
About.com - Japan Travel - Tokyo DisneySea
Happy Jappy Travel Tour Guide - DisneySea – Mediterranean Harbour

 
Themed areas in Walt Disney Parks and Resorts
Tokyo DisneySea